James Burgh (1714–1775) was a British Whig politician whose book Political Disquisitions set out an early case for free speech and universal suffrage: in it, he writes, "All lawful authority, legislative, and executive, originates from the people." He has been judged "one of England's foremost propagandists for radical reform".

Burgh also ran a dissenting academy and wrote on subjects such as educational reform. In the words of Lyndall Gordon, his widow acted as "fairy godmother"  to early feminist Mary Wollstonecraft, then a young and unpublished schoolmistress, helping her to set up her own boarding school. Wollstonecraft entitled her first book Thoughts on the Education of Daughters (1787), alluding to Burgh's Thoughts on Education (1747) which in turn alludes to John Locke's 1693 work, Some Thoughts Concerning Education.

Life and works

Burgh was born and raised in Madderty, Scotland. His father was a minister of the parish in the Church of Scotland. Burgh was raised a Presbyterian, which strongly contributed to his fight for moral issues.  He attended St. Andrews University with the intention of studying for the ministry. An illness prevented him from completing his degree and he entered the linen trade. Failure at that sent him to England in the early 1740s. For a short time he was a printer's helper and then in 1746 he became an assistant master (teacher) in an academy just north of London. The next year, he became master (principal) of his own academy in Stoke Newington. In 1750, he moved his school to nearby Newington Green, and ran it there for 19 years.

In 1754, Burgh's The Dignity of Human Nature was published. This is his first major publication, and one that bears a striking resemblance to Benjamin Franklin's Poor Richard's Almanack. In 1761, Burgh wrote The Art of Speaking, an educational book focusing on oratory. In 1766, he wrote the first volume of Crito, a collection of essays on religious toleration, contemporary politics, and educational theories. The second volume followed a year later. This is his first work that included a strong emphasis on politics.

Burgh became involved in the early 1760s with a group called the Honest Whigs, a club that met on alternate Thursday evenings in a coffeehouse, then an important social and political meeting place. Other members of the group included Richard Price, Joseph Priestley, Benjamin Franklin, James Boswell and others. In 1774, Burgh wrote his most popular work, Political Disquisitions. The three-volume work was intended by Burgh to be longer, but his deteriorating health caused him to stop after the third volume. Burgh died a year later on 26 August 1775.

Political Disquisitions (1774)
Of the three volumes of Political Disquisitions, the third is the most widely referenced. The book was inspired by the radical reform movement of the time, and includes many of Burgh's feelings on social, religious, political and educational reforms. Burgh also includes many other authors in the book, with the strongest influence being that of John Locke.

Thomas Jefferson included the work with other writings in a course of recommended reading for James Madison and James Monroe. In 1803, while Jefferson was president of the United States, he urged the work on Congress. The book was popular among American colonists and became a source of inspiration for American Revolutionaries.

Quotations
From chapter 9, "Of the Liberty of Speech and Writing on Political Subjects", on public versus private liberty:

That all history shows the necessity, to the preservation of liberty, of every subjects having a watchful eye on the conduct of Kings, Ministers, and Parliament, and of every subjects being not only secured, but encouraged in alarming his fellow subjects on occasion of every attempt upon public liberty.

On the consequences of libel: "Punishing libels public or private is foolish, because it does not answer the end, and because the end is a bad one, if it could be answered."

Burgh thought libel was acceptable as long as the accusation was aimed only at the political conduct. Private matters were not to be slandered. He explained this by saying that "we are to take care of the public safety at all adventures." Public libel was not a crime to Burgh, but rather "the unavoidable inconvenience attendant upon a high station, which he who dislikes must avoid, and keep himself private."

On freedom of speech with limitations:

No man ought to be hindered saying or writing what he pleases on the conduct of those who undertake the management of national affairs, in which all are concerned, and therefore have the right to inquire, and to publish their suspicions concerning them. For if you punish the slanderer, you deter the fair inquirer.

On the possession of firearms:

No kingdom can be secured otherwise than by arming the people. The possession of arms is the distinction between a freeman and a slave. He, who has nothing, and who himself belongs to another, must be defended by him, whose property he is, and needs no arms. But he, who thinks he is his own master, and has what he can call his own, ought to have arms to defend himself, and what he possesses; else he lives precariously, and at discretion.

Bibliography
 Burgh, James. Political Disquisitions. Volume III. New York: Da Capo Press, 1971.
 Burgh, James. The Art of Speaking. 4th ed. Philadelphia: Printed and sold by R Aitken, bookseller, 1775.

References

Sources
 Hay, Carla H. James Burgh, Spokesman for Reform in Hanoverian England. Washington D.C.: University Press of America, 1979.
 Kramnick, Isaac. "Republicanism Revisited: The Case of James Burgh". Proceedings of the American Antiquarian Society, Volume 102, Part 1: 81-98. Worcester, Massachusetts: Published by the Society, 1992.

External links

 

1714 births
1775 deaths
Alumni of the University of St Andrews
English political writers
Education writers
Whig (British political party) politicians
Dissenting academy tutors
English male non-fiction writers